Alexander A. Moore (October 1, 1874 – March 29, 1952) was a farmer and a provincial level politician from Alberta, Canada. He was elected to the Legislative Assembly of Alberta in a by-election on November 3, 1919 and served until 1926.

Political career
Moore ran for a seat in the Legislative Assembly of Alberta in a provincial by-election held in the Cochrane electoral district on November 3, 1919. The by-election was called due to the death of speaker Charles Fisher. He defeated E.V. Thompson a candidate of the governing Liberals in a tough race.

The Liberals attempted to win the by-election by having every member of the Cabinet and many back benches in the Liberal caucus campaign in the district. Moore was selected at a nomination meeting held on July 16, 1919, and campaigned in the district well before the writ was dropped.

With Moore winning the by-election, he became the first member elected under the United Farmers banner, joining two  farmer-friendly Non-Partisan League MLAs already in the legislature.

Moore was re-elected in the 1921 Alberta general election.

He served until 1926 before retiring.

References

External links
Legislative Assembly of Alberta Members Listing

1874 births
1952 deaths
United Farmers of Alberta MLAs